Hajji Kola or Haji Kola or Hajji Kala or Haji Kala may refer to:
 Hajji Kola, Gatab, Babol County
 Hajji Kola, Lalehabad, Babol County
 Hajji Kola, Juybar
 Hajji Kola, Nur
 Hajji Kola, Qaem Shahr
 Hajji Kola-ye Arazlu, Qaem Shahr County
 Hajji Kola-ye Sanam, Qaem Shahr County
 Hajji Kola, Sari
 Hajji Kola, Chahardangeh, Sari County
 Hajji Kola, Lafur, Savadkuh County
 Hajji Kola, Shirgah, Savadkuh County